Summoning the Bygones is the third full-length studio album by BILOCATE. It was released four years after Sudden Death Syndrome. Quoted is a description of the album written by BILOCATE: "Summoning The Bygones is BILOCATE's early visions presented in a new outfit, we've always felt that Dysphoria has much value to offer to listeners, however, maybe it got somehow underrated due to the weak sound quality (compared to SDS), so we'd like to share the same spirit and music and ideas with our listeners but with more proper arrangements, production, and sound quality.

The album also includes a modified version of "Days of Joy" under a new name (which is actually the first name this song had originally when it was created in 2003), in addition to a brand new song and a cover song.

As with its predecessor Sudden Death Syndrome, the album was co-produced, mixed and mastered at Fascination Street Studios, Orebro, Sweden by Jens Bogren

The artwork of the album Summoning the Bygones won the Metal Riot's June Ultimate Cover Art Showdown.

Track listing

Personnel
BILOCATE
 Ramzi EsSayed – vocals
 Hani Al-Abbadi – bass guitar
 Rami Haikal – guitar; engineering
 Baha Farah – guitar
 Ahmad Kloub - Drums
 Waseem EsSayyed - Keyboards

References

Bilocate albums
2012 albums
Albums produced by Jens Bogren